The 270 Winchester Short Magnum or 270 WSM is a short, unbelted, magnum cartridge created by necking down the .300 Winchester Short Magnum and fitting it with a .277 caliber bullet. The correct name for the cartridge, as listed by the Sporting Arms and Ammunition Manufacturers' Institute (SAAMI), is 270 WSM, without a decimal point. It is a member of the Winchester Short Magnum family of cartridges.

Overview

When it was introduced, the 300 WSM sported a new case that showed a lot of promise for uses in other calibers. In 2002 Winchester introduced new cartridges in its Winchester Short Magnum family, including the 7 mm WSM and 270 WSM. This new .270 cartridge was the third commercial .270 ever produced, and the first one in 60 years.

The 270 WSM is an improvement over the older 270 Winchester providing higher velocity with bullets of the same weight, and thus a flatter trajectory and more energy. Velocities tend to be about  faster, in a cartridge that is shorter and can therefore be used in
a shorter action resulting in a more compact rifle if desired.

Performance
The .270 WSM is the only cartridge of the WSM family that produces notable ballistic gains over other existing cartridges. It the best performing short action on the market. The .300 WSM closely mimics the long-popular .300 Winchester Magnum, while the 7mm WSM matches performance of the 7mm Remington Magnum in similar barrel lengths. The .325 WSM is in a league of its own in North America as the 8 mm caliber has not become commonplace. 

The .270 WSM comes quite close in performance to that of the legendary .270 Weatherby Magnum, with notable differences being that the .270 WSM is chambered in a short action and normally utilizes a 24" barrel whereas the older Weatherby cartridge utilizes a long action and is most commonly paired with a 26" barrel. The .270 Weatherby has a belt and the .270 WSM does not.

See also
 List of rifle cartridges
 Table of handgun and rifle cartridges
 7 mm caliber
 6.8 Western
 Delta L problem

References

External links
The 270 WSM by Chuck Hawks
270 WSM Accuracy in Browning X-Bolt 

Pistol and rifle cartridges
Winchester Short Magnum rifle cartridges